Carl Georg Oscar Drude (5 June 1852 in Braunschweig – 1 February 1933 in Dresden) was a German botanist.

From 1870 he studied science and chemistry at the Collegium Carolinum in Braunschweig, relocating to the University of Göttingen the following year, where he was influenced by August Grisebach (1814-1879). In 1873 he obtained his PhD and subsequently served as an assistant to Friedrich Gottlieb Bartling (1798-1875).

From 1876 to 1879 he worked as a lecturer in botany at Göttingen, followed by an appointment as chair of botany at Dresden Technical University (1879). Here he served as director of its botanical gardens, which he systematically configured according to a phytogeographical principle. He remained at Dresden until his retirement in 1920, twice serving as university rector (1906-1907, 1918-1919).

He is known best for his research in the field of plant geography, that included mapping of the world's different floristic zones. With Adolf Engler 1844-1930), he was co-editor of Die Vegetation der Erde (1896-1928).

Principal works 
 Atlas der Pflanzenverbreitung, 1887
 Handbuch der Pflanzengeographie, 1890
 Deutschlands Pflanzengeographie, 1896-
 Die Ökologie der Pflanzen, 1914.

References 
 Deutsche Biographie Drude, Carl Georg Oscar

19th-century German botanists
German ecologists
1852 births
1933 deaths
Scientists from Braunschweig
People from the Duchy of Brunswick
Technical University of Braunschweig alumni
Academic staff of the University of Göttingen
20th-century German botanists